Thaddeus Venediktovich Bulgarin (Polish Jan Tadeusz Krzysztof Bułharyn,  – ), was a Russian writer, journalist and publisher of Polish ancestry. In addition to his newspaper work, he rejuvenated the Russian novel, and published the first theatrical almanac in Russian. During his life, his novels were translated and published in English, French, German, Swedish, Polish, and Czech. He served as a soldier under Napoleon, and in later life as an agent of the Czar's secret police. As a writer his self-imposed mission was to popularize the authoritarian policies of Alexander I and Nicholas I.

Life and career
Bulgarin was born into a noble Polish family near Minsk, Belarus (then Polish–Lithuanian Commonwealth). His father, one of Kosciuszko's associates, was exiled to Siberia for having assassinated a Russian general. Bulgarin was educated in a St. Petersburg military school, took part in the Battle of Friedland but was arrested for theft soon afterwards. While his regiment was stationed in Finland, Bulgarin deserted to Warsaw, but on the way was drafted to the Grande Armée. He fought under Napoleon's banners in the Peninsular War and the 1812 Lithuanian campaign. In 1812 Bulgarin was taken prisoner in Battle of Berezina and transported to Prussia. There is a 6-year lapse in his biography after that.

In 1820, Bulgarin travelled from Warsaw to St. Petersburg, where he published a critical review of Polish literature and started editing The Northern Archive. He also made friends with the playwright Alexander Griboyedov and the philologist Nicholas Gretsch. The latter helped him to edit the newspaper Northern Bee (1825–39), the literary journal Fatherland's Son (1825–59), and other reactionary periodicals.

Bulgarin's unscrupulous manners made him the most odious journalist in Russia. Alexander Pushkin, in particular, ridiculed him in a number of epigrams, changing his name to Figlyarin (from a Russian word for "clown"). Bulgarin retorted with epigrams, in which Pushkin's name was rendered as Chushkin (from the Russian word for "nonsense").

Inspired by Sir Walter Scott, Bulgarin wrote the Vejeeghen (Vyzhigin) series of historical novels, which used to be popular in Russia and abroad. He followed these with two sententious novels Dmitry the Pretender (1830), about the False Dmitry, and Mazepa (1834) about Ivan Mazepa. In 1837 he published under his own name a lengthy description of Imperial Russia, although much of the work was actually by Nikolai Alexeyevich Ivanov, then a Ph.D. student at Dorpat University.

Some of Bulgarin's stories are science fiction: Probable Tall-Tales is a far future story about the 29th century; Improbable Tall-Tales is a fantastic voyage into hollow Earth; The Adventures of Mitrofanushka on the Moon is a satire.

After Nicholas I's death, Bulgarin retired from the department of stud farms, in which he had been serving for many years, and withdrew to his manor in Karlova (Karlowa in German) a suburb of Tartu at the time, but now incorporated within the city.

Notes and references

Journalists from the Russian Empire
19th-century journalists from the Russian Empire
Male writers from the Russian Empire
19th-century Polish journalists
Russian science fiction writers
Russian people of Polish descent
Journalists from Minsk
1789 births
1859 deaths